Stephen Anthony Smith (born October 14, 1967) is an American sports television personality, sports radio host, and sports journalist. He is a commentator on ESPN's First Take, where he appears with Molly Qerim. He also makes frequent appearances as an NBA analyst on SportsCenter. Smith also is an NBA analyst for ESPN on NBA Countdown and NBA broadcasts on ESPN. He also hosted The Stephen A. Smith Show on ESPN Radio. Smith is a featured columnist for ESPNNY.com, ESPN.com, and The Philadelphia Inquirer.

Early life and education
Stephen Anthony Smith was born in the Bronx, a borough of New York City. He was raised in the Hollis section of Queens. Smith is the youngest of six children. He has four older sisters and had a older brother, Basil, who died in a car accident in 1992. He also has a half-brother on his father's side. Smith's parents were originally from Saint Thomas, U.S. Virgin Islands. His father managed a hardware store. Smith's maternal grandmother was white, the rest of his grandparents black. He graduated in 1986 from Thomas Edison High School in Queens.

After attending the Fashion Institute of Technology for one year, Smith received a basketball scholarship to attend Winston-Salem State University, a historically black university in Winston-Salem, North Carolina. In college, he played basketball under Hall of Fame coach Clarence Gaines. While still on the team, Smith wrote a column for the university newspaper, The News Argus, arguing Gaines should retire due to health issues. He is a member of the Omega Psi Phi fraternity. Smith graduated in 1991 with a Bachelor of Arts degree in mass communication.

Career

Print media
Smith began his print media career with the Winston-Salem Journal, the Greensboro News and Record, and the New York Daily News.

Beginning in 1994, Smith had a position as a writer for The Philadelphia Inquirer. He began reporting on the Philadelphia 76ers as their NBA columnist, and eventually, as a general sports columnist. On August 23, 2007, the Inquirer announced that Smith would no longer be writing columns and would instead be demoted back to the position of general assignment reporter. In 2008, the Inquirer ended its relationship with Smith, which coincided with Smith starting his own blog, stephena.com. In February 2010, Smith returned to The Philadelphia Inquirer after winning an arbitrator's ruling that he was to be reinstated but having to agree to remove all of his political views from his website and from cable news shows.

Radio

On April 11, 2005, Smith became the host of a weekday noon to 2 p.m. radio show on WEPN in New York City with his "right-hand man B.T. (Brandon Tierney)". On September 20, 2007, the show was shifted to the 2–4 p.m. slot, with the second hour being broadcast nationally on ESPN Radio, replacing the third hour of The Dan Patrick Show (Mike Tirico took over the first two hours). Smith's show came to an end in April 2008 as he sought to expand his career in television, and beginning May 1, Scott Van Pelt began hosting in the 3–4 p.m. hour that was previously Smith's.

In November 2009, Smith became an on-air contributor to Fox Sports Radio and broke the story of Allen Iverson's retirement on the Chris Myers–Steve Hartman afternoon show on November 25. Iverson later ended his short retirement and re-joined the Philadelphia 76ers on December 2. Smith became a Fox Sports Radio morning show host on January 4, 2010, replacing Washington, D.C.-based host Steve Czaban. On his radio program, Smith correctly predicted that LeBron James, Dwyane Wade, and Chris Bosh would all sign with the Miami Heat during 2010 free agency. In early 2011, Smith became a resident FSR NBA insider and ended his morning show.

It was announced on February 1, 2011, that Smith would be returning to ESPN as a columnist for ESPN.com and host for weekday local radio shows on 1050 ESPN Radio New York (WEPN-AM) at 7–9 p.m. ET as well as 710 ESPN Radio Los Angeles (KSPN-AM) at 6–8 p.m. PT. April 24, 2012, was Smith's last show for LA 710 ESPN.

In 2013, Smith left ESPN for Sirius XM Radio, where he joined Chris Russo's Mad Dog Sports Channel. The move was announced just one day after Smith made some controversial comments on ESPN2's First Take program regarding the Ray Rice situation.

On January 17, 2017, Smith moved from Sirius XM's Mad Dog Sports channel back to ESPN. His daily two-hour program is heard on WEPN in New York, KSPN in Los Angeles, Sirius XM's ESPN channel, and via syndication.

Television
Smith is currently one of the hosts of First Take on ESPN. He also appears as an analyst on various ESPN programs. He is known for provocative analysis and dour delivery.

Smith started his television career on the now-defunct cable network CNN/SI in 1999.

In August 2005, Smith started hosting a daily hour-long show on ESPN called Quite Frankly with Stephen A. Smith. After the show was cancelled in January 2007, he mainly concentrated on basketball, serving as an NBA analyst. He also appeared on other ESPN shows, including the reality series Dream Job, as well as serving as a frequent guest (and guest host) on Pardon the Interruption, Jim Rome Is Burning, and as a participant on 1st and 10. He appeared as an anchor on the Sunday morning edition of SportsCenter. On April 17, 2009, Smith announced on his website that he would be leaving ESPN on May 1, 2009. The Los Angeles Times reported that ESPN commented that, "We decided to move in different directions." Though according to Big Lead Sports, a source says that ESPN and Smith went to the negotiating table and could not reach an agreement.

Smith later returned to ESPN, and it was announced on April 30, 2012, on air that Smith would be joining First Take on a permanent, five-days-per-week basis under a new format for the show called "Embrace Debate" in which he squares off against longtime First Take commentator Skip Bayless.

On July 25, 2014, Smith made controversial remarks on First Take that women may provoke domestic abuse, in regards to the domestic violence situation involving Baltimore Ravens' running back Ray Rice and his wife. After criticism of the remarks, including comments on Twitter from ESPN reporter Michelle Beadle, Smith apologized for his words on a taped segment on ESPN. On July 29, 2014, Smith was suspended by ESPN for a week and did not appear on any of their programs again until August 6, 2014.

In late 2014, Smith signed a multi-year deal with ESPN that will pay him over $3 million per year.

In a March 9, 2015, episode of First Take, while discussing the topic of Philadelphia Eagles' head coach Chip Kelly trading away running back LeSean McCoy to the Buffalo Bills for linebacker Kiko Alonso, Smith said: "Chip Kelly has made decisions over the last couple of years that, dare I say, leave a few brothers feeling uncomfortable." Michael David Smith of NBS Sports believed that Smith had hinted Kelly's roster moves regarding the 2014 release of wide receiver DeSean Jackson, the McCoy trade, and letting wide receiver Jeremy Maclin depart for free agency to sign with the Kansas City Chiefs, while still keeping wide receiver Riley Cooper on the Eagles' roster might be racially motivated. In an interview with ESPN The Magazine that was published on May 8, 2015, McCoy admitted that while he respected Kelly as a head coach, he did not see eye to eye with him. McCoy also believed that some of the roster moves that are being made by Kelly are racially motivated. Kelly has said that the roster moves that he has made have nothing to do with race, it has to do with finding the right players that fit well into his team. Smith defended his comments by saying that he never used a form of the word racism to imply that Kelly was a racist.

On June 11, 2015, Smith received criticism for a comment he made about female soccer players during the 2015 FIFA Women's World Cup. While on SportsCenter, a replay was shown of a goal scored by Norway on a free kick against Germany. Tim Legler pointed out that the German players forming the wall turned their heads as the ball went by, and Smith joked that the players "might not have wanted to mess up their hair". Smith's comment was criticized as being sexist and a poor joke. ESPN said they spoke with Smith about the comment, and he later apologized in a series of tweets.

On November 5, 2016, Smith joined Top Rank's broadcasting team for the Manny Pacquiao vs. Jessie Vargas boxing pay-per-view event. In 2019, Smith became a UFC commentator as ESPN became the UFC's television broadcaster.

In 2020, Smith served as a commentator for the after-party coverage of the 92nd Academy Awards on ABC.

On June 10, 2021 Smith broke into the soccer coverage space as he put it "let's do that soccer". Smith selected a Euro2020 team and followed this up with another soccer segment called "Ain't No Way" on June 14, 2021.

Acting
Smith made his acting debut on the ABC soap opera General Hospital in a cameo appearance as a television reporter on February 2, 2007. Smith is a longtime fan of the show, as his older sisters watched it every day growing up. Smith appeared as Brick on General Hospital on March 31, 2016, and has made guest appearances in the role every year since.

In 2007, Smith was in the Chris Rock film I Think I Love My Wife.

Beginning in 2014, he has appeared in a series of Oberto all-natural beef jerky commercials as "The Little Voice in Your Stomach", each time appearing alongside sports figures, such as star athletes Seattle Seahawks cornerback Richard Sherman and pro snowboarder Louie Vito, and notable basketball sportscaster Dick "Dickie V" Vitale.

Personal life 
In a December 11, 2019, interview with GQ, Smith disclosed that he has two daughters, aged 10 and 11 years old at the time. He was once engaged. When asked why he never went through with the marriage, he said: "It didn't work out. Matter of fact, I just told my sister that the other day: none of your business ... Something about my job and my money. I said this is not a discussion. You'll get an answer if I want to give you an answer." 
Smith is a fan of hometown teams the New York Yankees and New York Knicks.

Filmography

Film

Television

Works

 2023: Straight Shooter: A Memoir of Second Chances and First Takes

First Take catchphrases 
Smith is known for his frequent use of catchphrases while hosting First Take, such as "blasphemous" when describing something completely outrageous that does not make sense to him. He also frequently refers to Green Bay Packers quarterback Aaron Rodgers as a "baaaaaaaad man" (with the "A" stretched out for several seconds). Smith has worn Rodgers' jersey on two occasions on First Take in 2017: once following the Dallas Cowboys' elimination at the hands of the Packers and once during a special taping of First Take from Dallas where Smith received boos from the live crowd.

Smith has been known to show a strong hatred towards the Cowboys, often at times mocking them with their "How 'Bout Them Cowboys?" slogan in a sarcastic manner, claiming that they are "an accident waiting to happen", and calling them "a damn disgrace". A song was even made all about Smith's hatred of the Cowboys. He has frequently mocked former Cowboys player and fellow First Take commentator Michael Irvin after losses, as well as other past and present ESPN employees who are Cowboys fans such as Skip Bayless, Will Cain and Marcus Spears.

Knowledge about hockey 
Smith has been known to say many times that he knows absolutely nothing about the sport of hockey, such as by saying that tie games still exist in the sport (the NHL abolished ties following the 2004–05 NHL lockout), despite the presence of three hockey teams from within the New York metropolitan area where he was brought up. In recent years, and especially after ESPN acquired broadcasting rights for the NHL in the United States as of the 2021-2022 season, Smith would talk about hockey more often on both First Take and his new show Stephen A.’s World, such as when he roasted the Edmonton Oilers’ Connor McDavid and Leon Draisaitl after they got swept by the Winnipeg Jets in the opening round of the 2021 Stanley Cup Playoffs and equated the Toronto Maple Leafs’ playoff failures to that of the Dallas Cowboys’. Smith would also have NHL defenseman P.K. Subban occasionally appear as a guest on both shows.

Opposition to recreational marijuana 
Smith is known for his outspoken stance on NFL players and the usage of marijuana (still prohibited by league policy, punishable by fine or suspension), loudly telling players to "Stay off the weed!" Examples of players that he has called out for smoking the drug include Stedman Bailey, Adrian Peterson, Josh Gordon, Joseph Randle, Randy Gregory, Aldon Smith, LeGarrette Blount, Le'veon Bell, and Martavis Bryant. He also has the same reaction for athletes of other leagues getting caught with the usage of marijuana. Firstly, when the NBA's Zach Randolph was caught and subsequently arrested for possession of marijuana with the intent to sell in August 2017, then another NBA star, D'Angelo Russell, getting cited for marijuana possession inside his luggage at New York's LaGuardia Airport while flying to Louisville in May 2019, and then Alex Caruso after the NBA star was arrested in Texas for marijuana possession in June 2021.

The day after the Golden State Warriors Game 1 overtime victory in the 2018 NBA Finals, which saw Cleveland Cavaliers player J. R. Smith dribble the ball out without attempting a shot in the dying seconds of the fourth quarter, thinking his team was leading the game rather than attempting to break the tie score, Stephen A. Smith jokingly delivered his "Stay off the weed!" line at the request of the live crowd attending the live First Take taping in Oakland, garnering applause from the crowd and his First Take co-hosts. The Warriors ultimately won the series and the NBA championship in a four-game sweep.

References

External links

Official website

1967 births
Living people
Sportspeople from the Bronx
Sportspeople from Queens, New York
Sportswriters from New York (state)
People from Hollis, Queens
Basketball players from New York City
African-American basketball players
African-American sports journalists
African-American television talk show hosts
American men's basketball players
American people of United States Virgin Islands descent
American sports journalists
American sports radio personalities
American television talk show hosts
Disney people
ESPN people
Guards (basketball)
National Basketball Association broadcasters
Winston-Salem State Rams men's basketball players
Fashion Institute of Technology alumni